Estrogen receptor beta (ERβ) also known as NR3A2 (nuclear receptor subfamily 3, group A, member 2) is one of two main types of estrogen receptor—a nuclear receptor which is activated by the sex hormone estrogen.  In humans ERβ is encoded by the ESR2 gene.

Function 
ERβ is a member of the family of estrogen receptors and the superfamily of nuclear receptor transcription factors.  The gene product contains an N-terminal DNA binding domain and C-terminal ligand binding domain and is localized to the nucleus, cytoplasm, and mitochondria.  Upon binding to 17-β-estradiol, estriol or related ligands, the encoded protein forms homo-dimers or hetero-dimers with estrogen receptor α  that interact with specific DNA sequences to activate transcription.  Some isoforms dominantly inhibit the activity of other estrogen receptor family members.  Several alternatively spliced transcript variants of this gene have been described, but the full-length nature of some of these variants has not been fully characterized.

ERβ may inhibit cell proliferation and opposes the actions of ERα in reproductive tissue.  ERβ may also have an important role in adaptive function of the lung during pregnancy.

ERβ is a potent tumor suppressor and plays a crucial role in many cancer types such as prostate cancer and ovarian cancer.

Mammary gland
ERβ knockout mice show normal mammary gland development at puberty and are able to lactate normally.  The mammary glands of adult virgin female mice are indistinguishable from those of age-matched wild-type virgin female mice. This is in contrast to ERα knockout mice, in which a complete absence of mammary gland development at puberty and thereafter is observed. Administration of the selective ERβ agonist ERB-041 to immature ovariectomized female rats produced no observable effects in the mammary glands, further indicating that the ERβ is non-mammotrophic.

Although ERβ is not required for pubertal development of the mammary glands, it may be involved in terminal differentiation in pregnancy, and may also be necessary to maintain the organization and differentiation of mammary epithelium in adulthood. In old female ERβ knockout mice, severe cystic mammary disease that is similar in appearance to postmenopausal mastopathy develops, whereas this does not occur in aged wild-type female mice. However, ERβ knockout mice are not only deficient in ERβ signaling in the mammary glands, but also have deficient progesterone exposure due to impairment of corpora lutea formation. This complicates attribution of the preceding findings to mammary ERβ signaling.

Selective ERβ agonism with diarylpropionitrile (DPN) has been found to counteract the proliferative effects in the mammary glands of selective ERα agonism with propylpyrazoletriol (PPT) in ovariectomized postmenopausal female rats. Similarly, overexpression of ERβ via lentiviral infection in mature virgin female rats decreases mammary proliferation. ERα signaling has proliferative effects in both normal breast and breast cancer cell lines, whereas ERβ has generally antiproliferative effects in such cell lines. However, ERβ has been found to have proliferative effects in some breast cell lines.

Expression of ERα and ERβ in the mammary gland have been found to vary throughout the menstrual cycle and in an ovariectomized state in female rats. Whereas mammary ERα in rhesus macaques is downregulated in response to increased estradiol levels, expression of ERβ in the mammary glands is not. Expression of ERα and ERβ in the mammary glands also differs throughout life in female mice. Mammary ERα expression is higher and mammary ERβ expression lower in younger female mice, while mammary ERα expression is lower and mammary ERβ expression higher in older female mice as well as in parous female mice. Mammary proliferation and estrogen sensitivity is higher in young female mice than in old or parous female mice, particularly during pubertal mammary gland development.

Tissue distribution
ERβ is expressed by many tissues including the uterus, blood monocytes and tissue macrophages, colonic and pulmonary epithelial cells and in prostatic epithelium and in malignant counterparts of these tissues. Also, ERβ is found throughout the brain at different concentrations in different neuron clusters. ERβ is also highly expressed in normal breast epithelium, although its expression declines with cancer progression. ERβ is expressed in all subtypes of breast cancer. Controversy regarding ERβ protein expression has hindered study of ERβ, but highly sensitive monoclonal antibodies have been produced and well-validated to address these issues.

ERβ abnormalities
ERβ function is related to various cardiovascular targets including ATP-binding cassette transporter A1 (ABCA1) and apolipoprotein A1 (ApoA-1). Polymorphism may affect ERβ function and lead to altered responses in postmenopausal women receiving hormone replacement therapy. Abnormalities in gene expression associated with ERβ have also been linked to autism spectrum disorder.

Disease

Cardiovascular disease
Mutations in ERβ have been shown to influence cardiomyocytes, the cells that comprise the largest part of the heart, and can lead to an increased risk of cardiovascular disease (CVD). There is a disparity in prevalence of CVD between pre- and post-menopausal women, and the difference can be attributed to estrogen levels. Many types of ERβ receptors exist in order to help regulate gene expression and subsequent health in the body, but binding of 17βE2 (a naturally occurring estrogen) specifically improves cardiac metabolism. The heart utilizes a lot of energy in the form of ATP to properly pump blood and maintain physiological requirements in order to live, and 17βE2 helps by increasing these myocardial ATP levels and respiratory function.

In addition, 17βE2 can alter myocardial signaling pathways and stimulate myocyte regeneration, which can aid in inhibiting myocyte cell death. The ERβ signaling pathway plays a role in both vasodilation and arterial dilation, which contributes to an individual having a healthy heart rate and a decrease in blood pressure. This regulation can increase endothelial function and arterial perfusion, both of which are important to myocyte health. Thus, alterations in this signaling pathways due to ERβ mutation could lead to myocyte cell death from physiological stress. While ERα has a more profound role in regeneration after myocyte cell death, ERβ can still help by increasing endothelial progenitor cell activation and subsequent cardiac function.

Alzheimer's disease
Genetic variation in ERβ is both sex and age dependent and ERβ polymorphism can lead to accelerated brain aging, cognitive impairment, and development of AD pathology. Similar to CVD, post-menopausal women have an increased risk of developing Alzheimer's disease (AD) due to a loss of estrogen, which affects proper aging of the hippocampus, neural survival and regeneration, and amyloid metabolism. ERβ mRNA is highly expressed in hippocampal formation, an area of the brain that is associated with memory. This expression contributes to increased neuronal survival and helps protect against neurodegenerative diseases such as AD. The pathology of AD is also associated with accumulation of amyloid beta peptide (Aβ). While a proper concentration of Aβ in the brain is important for healthy functioning, too much can lead to cognitive impairment. Thus, ERβ helps control Aβ levels by maintaining the protein it is derived from, β-amyloid precursor protein. ERβ helps by up-regulating insulin-degrading enzyme (IDE), which leads to β-amyloid degradation when accumulation levels begin to rise. However, in AD, lack of ERβ causes a decrease in this degradation and an increase in plaque build-up.

ERβ also plays a role in regulating APOE, a risk factor for AD that redistributes lipids across cells. APOE expression in the hippocampus is specifically regulated by 17βE2, affecting learning and memory in individuals afflicted with AD. Thus, estrogen therapy via an ERβ-targeted approach can be used as a prevention method for AD either before or at the onset of menopause. Interactions between ERα and ERβ can lead to antagonistic actions in the brain, so an ERβ-targeted approach can increase therapeutic neural responses independently of ERα. Therapeutically, ERβ can be used in both men and women in order to regulate plaque formation in the brain.

Neuroprotective benefits

Synaptic strength and plasticity
ERβ levels can dictate both synaptic strength and neuroplasticity through neural structure modifications. Variations in endogenous estrogen levels cause changes in dendritic architecture in the hippocampus, which affects neural signaling and plasticity. Specifically, lower estrogen levels lead to decreased dendritic spines and improper signaling, inhibiting plasticity of the brain. However, treatment of 17βE2 can reverse this affect, giving it the ability to modify hippocampal structure. As a result of the relationship between dendritic architecture and long-term potentiation (LTP), ERβ can enhance LTP and lead to an increase in synaptic strength.  Furthermore, 17βE2 promotes neurogenesis in developing hippocampal neurons and neurons in the subventricular zone and dentate gyrus of the adult human brain. Specifically, ERβ increases the proliferation of progenitor cells to create new neurons and can be increased later in life through 17βE2 treatment.

Ligands

Agonists

Non-selective
 Endogenous estrogens (e.g., estradiol, estrone, estriol, estetrol)
 Natural estrogens (e.g., conjugated estrogens)
 Synthetic estrogens (e.g., ethinylestradiol, diethylstilbestrol)

Selective
Agonists of ERβ selective over ERα include:

 20-Hydroxyecdysone (ecdysterone, 20-HE, 20-E) — phytoecdysteroid
 3β-Androstanediol (3β-diol) – endogenous
 8β-VE2
 AC-186
 Apigenin – phytoestrogen
 Daidzein – phytoestrogen
 DCW234
 Dehydroepiandrosterone (DHEA) – endogenous
 Diarylpropionitrile (DPN)
 ERB-79 and its active enantiomer ERB-26
 ERB-196 (WAY-202196)
 Erteberel (SERBA-1, LY-500307)
 FERb 033 – 62-fold selectivity for ERβ over ERα
 Genistein – phytoestrogen; 16-fold selectivity for ERβ over ERα
 Liquiritigenin (Menerba) – phytoestrogen
 Penduletin – phytoestrogen
 Prinaberel (ERB-041, WAY-202041)
 S-Equol ((S)-4',7-isoflavandiol) – phytoestrogen; 13-fold selectivity for ERβ over ERα
 WAY-166818
 WAY-200070
 WAY-214156

Antagonists

Non-selective
 Selective estrogen receptor modulators (e.g., tamoxifen, raloxifene)
 Antiestrogens (e.g., fulvestrant, ICI-164384)

Selective
Antagonists of ERβ selective over ERα include:

 PHTPP
 (R,R)-Tetrahydrochrysene ((R,R)-THC) – actually not selective over ERα, but rather an agonist instead of antagonist of ERα

Affinities

Interactions 

Estrogen receptor beta has been shown to interact with:

 CCND1,
 ESR1
 MAD2L1,
 NCOA3,
 NCOA6,
 RBM39, and
 SRC.

References

Further reading

External links 
 
 

Intracellular receptors
Transcription factors